Wrestling Superstars Live (WSL), previously known as AWA Superstars of Wrestling (AWA), was a governing body for a group of independent professional wrestling promotions and sanctioned various championships. It was founded in 1996 by Dale Gagner and Jonnie Stewart and closed in 2009.

History

Early history
In 1996, Dale Gagner, billing himself as "Dale Gagne", and his associate Jonnie Stewart, former American Wrestling Association (AWA) employees, began using the AWA name in the state of Minnesota, falsely claiming authorization from the Minnesota Secretary of State, and formed an organization known as AWA Superstars of Wrestling. They billed the organization as a continuation of the American Wrestling Association, which closed in 1991.

By 2005, the organization began to franchise the AWA Superstars of Wrestling name, selling memberships to existing independent promotions around the United States, Canada, United Kingdom, and Japan. Several members of AWA Superstars of Wrestling were former members of the National Wrestling Alliance. In a press release sent out on October 30, 2007, the organization announced that it would no longer sanction independent promotions. Gagner and Stewart noted that each of the remaining territories would be individually assessed.

Lawsuit, renaming, reorganization, and closure
On April 26, 2007 World Wrestling Entertainment (WWE) filed a lawsuit against Dale Gagner, citing trademark infringement, as WWE owned some American Wrestling Association properties due to their purchase of AWA from Verne Gagne. In a move to sidestep WWE, Jonnie Stewart, with the help of a Chicago-based copyright law firm, attempted to trademark the name "American Wrestling Alliance" instead.

On October 29, 2008, a settlement was reached between Gagner and WWE. The court ruling prohibits Gagner from use of the AWA name or any other derivatives. As a result, the organization was renamed to Wrestling Superstars Live (WSL). In 2009, WSL went out of business.

Championships
When the organization was formed in 1996, Wrestling Superstars Live claimed the lineages and names of the original American Wrestling Association (AWA) championships. However, following WWE's lawsuit against Gagner and Stewart, Wrestling Superstars Live ignored the AWA championship reigns and only the reigns from 1996 and forward were recognized.

Four championships were retired prior to WSL's closure: 
The AWA Superstars of Wrestling International Heavyweight Championship was retired in 2005.
The AWA Japan Women's Championship was replaced by the HCW World Women's Championship in December 2007.
The AWA World Junior Heavyweight Championship was re-branded as the "Zero1-Max International Junior Heavyweight Championship" in 2008.
The AWA Superstars of Wrestling United States Championship was replaced by the WSL World Fighting Championship	in March 2008.

Members
Wrestling Superstars Live had members in the United States, Canada, England, Japan, and Australia.

References

External links
 AWA championships at Wrestling-Titles.com

 
Independent professional wrestling promotions based in the Midwestern United States
Canadian professional wrestling promotions
Organizations disestablished in 2009
Organizations established in 1996